Queliceria is a monotypic genus of Venezuelan cellar spiders containing the single species, Queliceria discrepantis. It was first described by M. A. González-Sponga in 2003, and is only found in Venezuela.

See also
 List of Pholcidae species

References

Monotypic Araneomorphae genera
Pholcidae
Spiders of South America